Evergem is a railway station in Evergem, East Flanders, Belgium.  The station re-opened on 10 juni 2007 on the Line 58. The train services are operated by NMBS/SNCB.

History
Evergem had a railway station until 1959, but i needed to be closed, so the Belgian speedway R4 could be opened.
The NMBS decided to open a new station in 2007, so the people in Evergem would get a direct connection with Ghent.

Gallery

Train services
The station is served by the following service(s):

Local services (L-05) Eeklo - Ghent - Oudenaarde - Ronse
Local services (L-05) Eeklo - Ghent - Oudenaarde - Kortrijk (weekdays)

References

Railway stations in Belgium
Railway stations opened in 1861
1861 establishments in Belgium
Railway stations in East Flanders
Evergem